Unedogemmula hazarti is a species of sea snail, a marine gastropod mollusk in the family Turridae, the turrids.

Description

Distribution
This marine species occurs off Norfolk Island.

References

 Cossignani, T. (2021). Unedogemmula hazarti nuovo turride dall'Indo-Pacifico. Malacologia Mostra Mondiale. 113: 29-30.

External links
 Museo Malacologico Piceno : image

hazarti
Gastropods described in 2021